Squads for the 1976 AFC Asian Cup played in Iran.

Group A

China PR
Head coach:  Nian Weisi

Kuwait
Head coach:  Mário Zagallo

Malaysia
Head coach :  Datuk Maui Kuppan

Group B

Iran
Head coach :  Heshmat Mohajerani

Iraq
Head coach:  Lenko Grčić (Kaka)

South Yemen
Head coach:  Ali Mohsen Al-Moraisi

References

External links
China National Football Team Database

AFC Asian Cup squads